Zsolt Fehér (born 15 June 1975) is a Hungarian footballer who plays for Tápiószele SE as a defender. He finished his career playing in the NB II with Jászberény SE.

References

1975 births
Living people
People from Szolnok
Hungarian footballers
Hungary under-21 international footballers
Association football defenders
Budapesti VSC footballers
Szolnoki MÁV FC footballers
Bőcs KSC footballers
Békéscsaba 1912 Előre footballers
Jászberényi SE footballers
BFC Siófok players
Sportspeople from Jász-Nagykun-Szolnok County